Little by Little (stylized as little by little) was a Japanese pop rock band, consisting of vocalist Hideco and Tetsuhiko. little by little's record label is Sony Music Entertainment Japan and they are attached to Stardust Promotion. They are known mainly for their contributions to anime, including , the opening theme for the third season of Naruto, "Love & Peace", the second opening theme to Superior Defender Gundam Force, "Hummingbird", a closing theme for Yakitate!!

Member Profiles
 , vocals.
 , composition.

Discography

Albums
Sweet Noodle Pop (July 20, 2005)

Singles

References

External links 
Little by Little official website

Japanese pop rock music groups
Sony Music Entertainment Japan artists
Studioseven Recordings artists
Former Stardust Promotion artists